"God's Top Ten" is a song by Australian band INXS, which was released as the fifth single from their eleventh studio album, Switch (November 2005). The album was the first with new lead singer, J.D. Fortune, winner of the Rock Star: INXS competition. The single was released in 2006, but only in Poland and Canada as an airplay single, where it peaked at No. 18 and No. 88 respectively.

Song information

"God's Top Ten" was written by INXS guitarist and keyboardist, Andrew Farriss, and is predominantly about the late INXS frontman Michael Hutchence (1960–1997), his partner, Paula Yates  (1959–2000), and their daughter, Tiger Lily. Andrew and Tim Farriss (his brother, on guitar) have both separately said in TV interviews that this song is actually a gift for Tiger. In addition to new lead singer, J. D. Fortune's vocals, "God's Top Ten" also features the vocals of his fellow Rock Star: INXS contestant Suzie McNeil. Jane Stevenson of the Toronto Sun reviewed Switch (November 2005) and described this track "A pretty piano hook kicks off this soulful, strings-laden tribute to [the couple and their daughter] with McNeil and Fortune trading verses and singing together".

During a radio interview with the BBC, Andrew changed the lyrics around to the song from "When you hear his songs, on the radio, I don't need to tell you what you already know" to "When she hears his songs on the radio, I don't need to tell her what she already knows" and also changed "He's on God's top ten, where heaven never ends" to "He's on God's top ten, he'll always be my friend". The term "God's Top Ten" was also used in the band's song "Here Comes", off their album Shabooh Shoobah. The lyrics read "Here comes my kamikaze, Here comes God's top ten, Nothing to be done to stop it, Nothing to get in its way".

Charts

References 

2006 singles
INXS songs
Songs written by Andrew Farriss
Commemoration songs
Songs about musicians
2005 songs
Song recordings produced by Guy Chambers
Epic Records singles